Phalanx is the first live album released by  Australian surf rock band Australian Crawl. It was recorded live at concerts at Bombay Rock Gold Coast, Queensland and at the Sydney Entertainment Centre in October, 1983, during the 'Semantics' tour. The album was initially released on vinyl in December 1983 and was re-released on CD in May 1995. The album reached #4 on the National Album Charts being released by EMI.

The title of the album is derived from the name for the ancient Greek battle formation where long spears were presented from behind a wall of overlapping shields. The title can also refer more generally to a close-knit group of people, in this case the audience.

The cover features distinctive cartoon images by Michael Leunig with the front depicting five sharks swimming towards a lone wader – they are revealed to be five other swimmers with shark fin hair (see infobox). The back cover cartoon depicts a stage manager warning "Five Minutes Mr. Reyne" at the dressing room door. Meanwhile, Reyne is combing his hair backwards with Brylcream liberally applied, a guitar and a half-full bottle are nearby.

Phalanx was also released by Geffen Records in Europe but under a different title, Australian Crawl: Live, and with a different cover.

"Phalanx was the Crawl's fourth album... It yielded a rollicking single, in the form of the band's raucous cover of The Kingsmen's "Louie Louie"... As this album lodged itself at the top of the charts, the Crawl were off to England for some pre-Christmas shows with Duran Duran." – Glen A. Baker, 1983.

Track listing
 "Unpublished Critics" (James Reyne, Paul Williams) – 5:51
 "The Night" (Brad Robinson) – 3:50
 "La Califusa (Reyne) – 3:01
 "Love Beats Me Up" (Reyne) – 4:33
 "Things Don't Seem" (Sean Higgins, Guy McDonough) – 3:58
 "White Limbo" (Simon Binks) – 3:43
 "Louie Louie" (Richard Berry) – 5:48
 "Errol" (McDonough, Reyne) – 3:32
 "Reckless (Don't Be So)" (Reyne) – 5:41
 "The Boys Light Up" (Reyne) – 5:30

Songwriting credits from Australasian Performing Right Association (APRA).

Personnel
Credits:
 James Reyne — lead vocals, keyboards, guitar
 Simon Binks — lead guitar
 Guy McDonough — co-lead vocals, rhythm guitar
 Brad Robinson — rhythm guitar
 Paul Williams — bass guitar
 John Watson — drums
 Engineer — John Sayers

Charts

References

Australian Crawl albums
1983 live albums